This is a list of rulers of Pegu (Bago), one of the three main Mon-speaking provinces, located on the south-central coast of modern Myanmar. This is not a list of monarchs of the Hanthawaddy Kingdom, who ruled Lower Burma from Pegu during three separate periods (1369–1539, 1550–1552, 1740–1757).

Backgrounder

Various Mon language chronicles state different foundation dates of Pegu (Bago), ranging from 573 CE to 1152 CE. The Zabu Kuncha, an early 15th century Ava (Upper Burmese) administrative treatise, states that Pegu was founded in 1276/77.

However, the earliest extant evidence of Pegu as a place dates only to the late Pagan period: 1212 and 1266. A purported copy of a 1086 inscription does mention Pegu. At any rate, the Slapat Rajawan chronicle itself states that Pegu emerged from "desolate wilderness" only in the late Pagan period, and the first Pagan-appointed official at Pegu was Akhamaman in 1273/74.

Pagan period
In the late Pagan period, Pegu was not even the provincial capital of what would become known as the Pegu province in the 14th century. The provincial capital was Dala-Twante, the seat of Prince Kyawswa's fiefdom down to 1287.

Martaban Period

It is unclear if Pegu remained the provincial capital after Tarabya's death. According to the reporting in the Razadarit Ayedawbon, except for a brief period in the mid-1320s when King Saw Zein made it his temporary wartime capital, the other so-called governors of Pegu may have been just mayors. For example, in the early reign of King Hkun Law, the provincial capital seems to have been at Sittaung, where Law's deputy Nyi Maw-La-Mun resided.

See also
 Hanthawaddy Kingdom
 List of Burmese monarchs
 List of rulers of Martaban
 List of rulers of Bassein
 List of rulers of Ava
 List of rulers of Prome
 List of rulers of Toungoo

Notes

References

Bibliography
 
 
 
 
 
 
 

Pegu
Hanthawaddy dynasty